The 4th Corps of the Bosnian army was one of five later seven corps formed in 1992.

Operational Zone 
The 4th Corps was mainly responsible for then Mostar, the headquarters of the 4th Corps, and the Mostar region, but also Livno, Tomislavgrad and Trebinje, Konjic, Prozor, Jablanica.

Commanders
1st Commander: Colonel Arif Pašalić (until 6 November 1993)
2nd Commander: Sulejman Budaković
3rd Commander: Brigade General Ramiz Dreković
4th Commander: Brigade General Mustafa Polutak

4th Corps Units 
4th Muslim Liberation Brigade "Škorpioni" (Konjic)
Commander: Nezim Halilović "Muderris"
19th East Herzegovina Light Brigade
41st Mostar Brigade
Commander: 
Arif Pašalić, 
Midhat Hujdur Hujka, 
Semir Drljević Lovac, 
Esad Humo, Ramiz Tule
42nd Mountain Brigade
43rd Mountain Brigade (Konjic)
44th Mountain Brigade (Jablanica)
45th Mountain Brigade 'Neretvica' (Buturovic Polje, near Jablanica)
Commander: Haso Hakalović
48th Mountain Brigade (Mostar)
49th Mountain Brigade
450th Light Infantry Brigade (Bjelimići)
Military Police Battalion (Mostar)
Independent Battalion (Prozor)
Independent Detachments

References 

Corps of the Army of the Republic of Bosnia and Herzegovina
Military units and formations established in 1992